Buller's chipmunk (Neotamias bulleri) is a species of rodent in the family Sciuridae. It is endemic to Mexico.

References

Endemic mammals of Mexico
Neotamias
Mammals described in 1889
Taxonomy articles created by Polbot
Fauna of the Sierra Madre Occidental